A special election was held in  on August 1, 1796 and September 12, 1796 to fill a vacancy left by the resignation of Benjamin Goodhue (F) in June, 1796.  Goodhue had resigned upon being elected to the Senate.

Election results
Two elections were held due to a majority not being achieved on the first vote.

Sewall took his seat on December 7, 1796

See also
List of special elections to the United States House of Representatives

References

United States House of Representatives 1796 10
Massachusetts 1796 10
Massachusetts 1796 10
1796 10
Massachusetts 10
United States House of Representatives 10